1DOL (stylized as iDOL) was a 2010 Philippine drama starring Sarah Geronimo, Sam Milby and Coco Martin. That aired on ABS-CBN's Primetime Bida evening block from September 6, 2010 to October 22, 2010 replacing Agua Bendita.

The show was permanently cancelled on October 22, 2010, garnering only 35 episodes in total before being replaced by Mara Clara.

Series overview

Conception
Sarah Geronimo makes her comeback project of the musical drama series after the success of Bituing Walang Ningning (2006) and Pangarap na Bituin (2007).

1DOL was launched during the ABS-CBN Trade Event held August 24, 2010, at the World Trade Center Manila. It is also part of ABS-CBN's celebration for the 60th Year of Pinoy Soap Opera.

On August 21 to September 4, 2010, ABS-CBN aired in its Saturday primetime block "The Making of 1DOL", a 30-minute special on how the series was conceptualized.

The series premiered on September 6, 2010, simulcasted its pilot episode on three different television channels Studio 23 (now S+A), Cinema One and ABS-CBN.

Synopsis
Belinda's on her way to becoming the next singing idol. When her parents Samson and Laura have incurred twenty million pesos worth of debt to a family friend, she was suddenly forced to leave her showbiz life behind. They have no choice but to run for their lives or else they would land in jail with no one to help them out. But in the process, Belinda not only loses her chance to make it big but she also walks away from Vince, her childhood friend whom she secretly loves. When her family moves to a remote province did Belinda meet Lando who instantly falls in love with her.

Cast and characters
1DOL revolves not only in the main characters but a core group of supporters, led by Belinda "Billie/Jean" Suarez (Sarah Geronimo), Fernando "Lando" Lagdameo (Coco Martin) and Vincent "Vince" Serrano (Sam Milby). Lando and Vince have been secretly crushing on the same girl who has two different identities.

Main cast
Sarah Geronimo as Belinda "Billie/Jean" Suarez
Sam Milby as Vincent "Vince" Serrano
Coco Martin as Fernando "Lando" Lagdameo

Supporting cast
Zsa Zsa Padilla as Eleanor Serrano
Agot Isidro as Laura Suarez
Rita Avila as Sandra Rosales
Robert Seña as Ben Serrano
Jessa Zaragoza as Magdalaena
Malou de Guzman as Sharona Sulangan
Neil Ryan Sese as Samson Suarez
K Brosas as Antonia "Toyang" Timbales
Tippy Dos Santos as Carol Serrano
Emmanuelle Vera as Diana Rosales
Marissa Sanchez as Lucy
Thou Reyes as Buloy

Music
In every episode of the show, musical numbers are performed by the cast.

Songs

See also
List of programs broadcast by ABS-CBN
List of dramas of ABS-CBN
Pinoy Idol

References

External links

1DOL on ABS-CBN
 

ABS-CBN drama series
Television series by Dreamscape Entertainment Television
Philippine teen drama television series
2010 Philippine television series debuts
2010 Philippine television series endings
Philippine romantic comedy television series
Philippine musical television series
Filipino-language television shows
Television shows set in the Philippines